WHCP may refer to:

 WHCP-LP, a low-power radio station (101.5 FM) licensed to serve Cambridge, Maryland, United States
 WQCW, a television station (channel 17, virtual 30) licensed to serve Portsmouth, Ohio, United States, which held the call sign WHCP from 1997 to 2006
 Windows Hardware Certification Program